The Great Famine, also known within Ireland as the Great Hunger or simply the Famine and outside Ireland as the Irish Potato Famine, was a period of starvation and disease in Ireland from 1845 to 1852 that constituted a historical social crisis which subsequently had a major impact on Irish society and history as a whole. The worst year of the period was 1847, which became known as "Black '47". During the Great Hunger, roughly 1 million people died and more than 1 million fled the country, causing the country's population to fall by 20–25% (in some towns falling as much as 67%) between 1841 and 1871. Between 1845 and 1855, at least 2.1 million people left Ireland, primarily on packet ships but also on steamboats and barques—one of the greatest exoduses from a single island in history.

The proximate cause of the famine was a potato blight that infected potato crops throughout Europe during the 1840s, causing an additional 100,000 deaths outside Ireland and influencing much of the unrest in the widespread European Revolutions of 1848. Longer-term causes include the system of absentee landlordism and single-crop dependence. Initial limited but constructive government actions to alleviate famine distress were ended by a new Whig administration in London, which pursued a laissez-faire economic doctrine, and only resumed later. The refusal of London to bar export of food from Ireland during the famine was an immediate and continuing source of controversy, contributing to anti-British sentiment and the campaign for independence. Additionally, the famine indirectly resulted in tens of thousands of households being evicted, exacerbated by a provision forbidding access to workhouse aid while in possession of more than 1/4 acre of land.

The famine was a defining moment in the history of Ireland, which was part of the United Kingdom of Great Britain and Ireland from 1801 to 1922. The famine and its effects permanently changed the island's demographic, political, and cultural landscape, producing an estimated 2 million refugees and spurring a century-long population decline. For both the native Irish and those in the resulting diaspora, the famine entered folk memory. The strained relations between many Irish and their ruling British government worsened further because of the famine, heightening ethnic and sectarian tensions and boosting nationalism and republicanism both in Ireland and among Irish emigrants around the world. English documentary maker John Percival said that the famine "became part of the long story of betrayal and exploitation which led to the growing movement in Ireland for independence." Scholar Kirby Miller makes the same point. Debate exists regarding nomenclature for the event, whether to use the term "Famine", "Potato Famine" or "Great Hunger", the last of which some believe most accurately captures the complicated history of the period.

The potato blight returned to Europe in 1879 but, by this time, the Land War (one of the largest agrarian movements to take place in 19th-century Europe) had begun in Ireland. The movement, organized by the Land League, continued the political campaign for the Three Fs which was issued in 1850 by the Tenant Right League during the Great Famine. When the potato blight returned to Ireland in the 1879 famine, the League boycotted "notorious landlords" and its members physically blocked the evictions of farmers; the consequent reduction in homelessness and house demolition resulted in a drastic reduction in the number of deaths.

Causes and contributing factors

Since the Acts of Union in January 1801, Ireland had been part of the United Kingdom. Executive power lay in the hands of the Lord Lieutenant of Ireland and Chief Secretary for Ireland, who were appointed by the British government. Ireland sent 105 members of parliament to the House of Commons of the United Kingdom, and Irish representative peers elected 28 of their own number to sit for life in the House of Lords. Between 1832 and 1859, 70% of Irish representatives were landowners or the sons of landowners.

In the 40 years that followed the union, successive British governments grappled with the problems of governing a country which had, as Benjamin Disraeli stated in 1844, "a starving population, an absentee aristocracy, an alien established Protestant church, and in addition, the weakest executive in the world". One historian calculated that, between 1801 and 1845, there had been 114 commissions and 61 special committees inquiring into the state of Ireland, and that "without exception their findings prophesied disaster; Ireland was on the verge of starvation, her population rapidly increasing, three-quarters of her labourers unemployed, housing conditions appalling and the standard of living unbelievably low".

Lectures printed in 1847 by John Hughes, Bishop of New York, are a contemporary exploration into the antecedent causes, particularly the political climate, in which the Irish famine occurred.

Landlords and tenants

During the 18th century, the "middleman system" for managing landed property was introduced. Rent collection was left in the hands of the landlords' agents, or middlemen. This assured the landlord of a regular income and relieved them of direct responsibility while leaving tenants open to exploitation by the middlemen.

Catholics, the majority of whom lived in conditions of poverty and insecurity, made up 80% of the population. At the top of the "social pyramid" was the "ascendancy class", the English and Anglo-Irish families who owned most of the land and held more or less unchecked power over their tenants. Many of these absentee landlords lived in England. The rent revenue—collected from "impoverished tenants" who were paid minimal wages to raise crops and livestock for export—was mostly sent to England.

In 1843, the British Government considered that the land question in Ireland was the root or foundational cause of disaffection in the country. They established a Royal Commission, chaired by the Earl of Devon, to enquire into the laws regarding the occupation of land. Daniel O'Connell described this commission as "perfectly one-sided", being composed of landlords, with no tenant representation.

In February 1845, Devon reported:
It would be impossible adequately to describe the privations which they [the Irish labourer and his family] habitually and silently endure ... in many districts their only food is the potato, their only beverage water ... their cabins are seldom a protection against the weather ... a bed or a blanket is a rare luxury ... and nearly in all their pig and a manure heap constitute their only property.

The Commissioners concluded they could not "forbear expressing our strong sense of the patient endurance which the labouring classes have exhibited under sufferings greater, we believe, than the people of any other country in Europe have to sustain". The Commission stated that bad relations between landlord and tenant were principally responsible. There was no hereditary loyalty, feudal tie, or mitigating tradition of paternalism as existed in Britain, as the Anglo-Irish aristocracy that supplanted the Gaelic aristocracy in the 17th century was of a different religion and newer. In 1800, the 1st Earl of Clare observed of landlords that "confiscation is their common title". According to the historian Cecil Woodham-Smith, landlords regarded the land as a source of income, from which as much as possible was to be extracted. With the peasantry "brooding over their discontent in sullen indignation" (in the words of the Earl of Clare), the landlords largely viewed the countryside as a hostile place in which to live. Some landlords visited their property only once or twice in a lifetime, if ever. The rents from Ireland were generally spent elsewhere; an estimated £6,000,000 was remitted out of Ireland in 1842.

The ability of middlemen was measured by the rent income they could contrive to extract from tenants. They were described in evidence before the commission as "land sharks", "bloodsuckers", and "the most oppressive species of tyrant that ever lent assistance to the destruction of a country". The middlemen leased large tracts of land from the landlords on long leases with fixed rents, which they sublet as they saw fit. They would split a holding into smaller and smaller parcels so as to increase the amount of rent they could obtain. Tenants could be evicted for reasons such as non-payment of rents (which were high), or a landlord's decision to raise sheep instead of grain crops. A cottier paid his rent by working for the landlord while the spalpeen, an itinerant labourer, paid his short-term lease through temporary day work.

As any improvement made on a holding by a tenant became the property of the landlord when the lease expired or was terminated, the incentive to make improvements was limited. Most tenants had no security of tenure on the land; as tenants "at will", they could be turned out whenever the landlord chose. The only exception to this arrangement was in Ulster where, under a practice known as "tenant right", a tenant was compensated for any improvement they made to their holding. According to Woodham-Smith, the commission stated that "the superior prosperity and tranquillity of Ulster, compared with the rest of Ireland, were due to tenant right".

Landlords in Ireland often used their powers without compunction, and tenants lived in dread of them. Woodham-Smith writes that, in these circumstances, "industry and enterprise were extinguished and a peasantry created which was one of the most destitute in Europe".

Tenants and subdivisions

Holdings were so small that no crop other than potatoes would suffice to feed a family. Shortly before the famine, the British government reported that poverty was so widespread that one-third of all Irish small holdings could not support the tenant families after rent was paid; the families survived only by earnings as seasonal migrant labour in England and Scotland. Following the famine, reforms were implemented making it illegal to further divide land holdings.

The 1841 census showed a population of just over eight million. Two-thirds of people depended on agriculture for their survival but rarely received a working wage. They had to work for their landlords in return for the patch of land they needed to grow enough food for their own families. This was the system that forced Ireland's peasantry into monoculture since only the potato could be grown in sufficient quantity to meet nutritional needs.

Potato dependency

The potato was introduced to Ireland as a garden crop of the gentry. By the late 17th century, it had become widespread as a supplementary rather than a principal food; the main diet was still based on butter, milk, and grain products.

With the "expansion of the economy" between 1760 and 1815 due to the Napoleonic wars (1805–1815), which had increased the demand for food in Britain, the tillage increased to such an extent, that there was less and less land for small farmers, and the potato was chiefly adopted by the people because of its quick growth on a comparatively small space. By 1800, for one in three of the population, the potato had become a staple food, especially in winter. It eventually became a staple year-round for farmers. The widespread dependency on this single crop, and a disproportionate share of the potatoes grown in Ireland being of a single variety, the Irish Lumper i.e. the lack of genetic variability among the potato plants in Ireland and Europe, were two of the reasons why the emergence of Phytophthora infestans had such devastating effects in Ireland and in similar areas of Europe.

Potatoes were essential to the development of the cottier system; they supported an extremely cheap workforce, but at the cost of lower living standards. For the labourer, "a potato wage" shaped the expanding agrarian economy. The potato was also used extensively as a fodder crop for livestock immediately prior to the famine.

Blight in Ireland

Prior to the arrival in Ireland of the disease Phytophthora infestans, commonly known as "blight", only two main potato plant diseases had been discovered. One was called "dry rot" or "taint", and the other was a virus known popularly as "curl". Phytophthora infestans is an oomycete (a variety of parasitic, non-photosynthetic organisms closely related to brown algae, and not a fungus).

In 1851, the Census of Ireland Commissioners recorded 24 failures of the potato crop going back to 1728, of varying severity. General crop failures, through disease or frost, were recorded in 1739, 1740, 1770, 1800, and 1807. In 1821 and 1822, the potato crop failed in Munster and Connaught. In 1830 and 1831, Mayo, Donegal, and Galway suffered likewise. In 1832, 1833, 1834, and 1836, dry rot and curl caused serious losses, and in 1835 the potato failed in Ulster. Widespread failures throughout Ireland occurred in 1836, 1837, 1839, 1841, and 1844. According to Woodham-Smith, "the unreliability of the potato was an accepted fact in Ireland".

How and when the blight Phytophthora infestans arrived in Europe is still uncertain; however, it almost certainly was not present prior to 1842, and probably arrived in 1844. The origin of the pathogen has been traced to the Toluca Valley in Mexico, whence it spread first within North America and then to Europe. The 1845–1846 blight was caused by the HERB-1 strain of the blight.

In 1844, Irish newspapers carried reports concerning a disease that for two years had attacked the potato crops in America. In 1843 and 1844, blight largely destroyed the potato crops in the Eastern United States. Ships from Baltimore, Philadelphia, or New York City could have carried diseased potatoes from these areas to European ports. American plant pathologist William C. Paddock posited that the blight was transported via potatoes being carried to feed passengers on clipper ships sailing from America to Ireland. Once introduced in Ireland and Europe, blight spread rapidly. By mid-August 1845, it had reached much of northern and central Europe; Belgium, The Netherlands, northern France, and southern England had all already been affected.

On 16 August 1845, The Gardeners' Chronicle and Horticultural Gazette reported "a blight of unusual character" on the Isle of Wight. A week later, on 23 August, it reported that "A fearful malady has broken out among the potato crop ... In Belgium the fields are said to be completely desolated. There is hardly a sound sample in Covent Garden market ... As for cure for this distemper, there is none." These reports were extensively covered in Irish newspapers. On 11 September, the Freeman's Journal reported on "the appearance of what is called 'cholera' in potatoes in Ireland, especially in the north". On 13 September, The Gardeners' Chronicle announced: "We stop the Press with very great regret to announce that the potato Murrain has unequivocally declared itself in Ireland."

Nevertheless, the British government remained optimistic over the next few weeks, as it received conflicting reports. Only when the crop was lifted (harvested) in October, did the scale of destruction become apparent. Prime Minister Sir Robert Peel wrote to Sir James Graham in mid-October that he found the reports "very alarming", but reminded him that there was, according to Woodham-Smith, "always a tendency to exaggeration in Irish news".

Crop loss in 1845 has been estimated at anywhere from one-third to as high as one-half of cultivated acreage. The Mansion House Committee in Dublin, to which hundreds of letters were directed from all over Ireland, claimed on 19 November 1845 to have ascertained beyond the shadow of a doubt that "considerably more than one-third of the entire of the potato crop ... has been already destroyed".

In 1846, three-quarters of the harvest was lost to blight. By December, a third of a million destitute people were employed in public works. According to Cormac Ó Gráda, the first attack of potato blight caused considerable hardship in rural Ireland, from the autumn of 1846, when the first deaths from starvation were recorded. Seed potatoes were scarce in 1847. Few had been sown, so, despite average yields, hunger continued. 1848 yields were only two-thirds of normal. Since over three million Irish people were totally dependent on potatoes for food, hunger and famine were inevitable.

Reaction in Ireland

The Corporation of Dublin sent a memorial to the Queen, "praying her" to call Parliament together early (Parliament was at this time prorogued), and to recommend the requisition of some public money for public works, especially railways in Ireland. The Town Council of Belfast met and made similar suggestions, but neither body asked for charity, according to John Mitchel, one of the leading Repealers.

In early November 1845, a deputation from the citizens of Dublin, including the Duke of Leinster, Lord Cloncurry, Daniel O'Connell and the Lord Mayor, went to the Lord Lieutenant of Ireland, Lord Heytesbury, to offer suggestions, such as opening the ports to foreign corn, stopping distillation from grain, prohibiting the export of foodstuffs, and providing employment through public works. Lord Heytesbury urged them not to be alarmed, that they "were premature", that scientists were enquiring into all those matters, and that the Inspectors of Constabulary and Stipendiary Magistrates were charged with making constant reports from their districts, and there was no "immediate pressure on the market".

On 8 December 1845, Daniel O'Connell, head of the Repeal Association, proposed several remedies to the pending disaster. One of the first things he suggested was the introduction of "Tenant-Right" as practised in Ulster, giving the landlord a fair rent for his land, but giving the tenant compensation for any money he might have laid out on the land in permanent improvements. O'Connell noted actions taken by the Belgian legislature during the same season, as they had been hit by blight, too: shutting their ports against the export of provisions and opening them to imports. He suggested that, if Ireland had a domestic Parliament, the ports would be thrown open and the abundant crops raised in Ireland would be kept for the people of Ireland, as the Dublin parliament had done during the food shortages of the 1780s. O'Connell maintained that only an Irish parliament would provide both food and employment for the people. He said that repeal of the Act of Union was a necessity and Ireland's only hope.

Mitchel later wrote one of the first widely circulated tracts on the famine, The Last Conquest of Ireland (Perhaps), published in 1861. It proposed that British actions during the famine and their treatment of the Irish were a deliberate effort at genocide. It contained a sentence that has since become famous: "The Almighty, indeed, sent the potato blight, but the English created the Famine." Mitchel was charged with sedition because of his writings, but this charge was dropped. He was convicted by a packed jury under the newly enacted Treason Felony Act and sentenced to 14 years transportation to Bermuda.

According to Charles Gavan Duffy, The Nation insisted that the proper remedy, retaining in the country the food raised by her people until the people were fed, was one which the rest of Europe had adopted, and one which even the parliaments of the Pale (i.e., before the union with Great Britain in 1801) had adopted in periods of distress.

In the modern era, this name, while loosely translated as "the hard-time", is always denoted with a capital letter to express its specific historic meaning.

The period of the potato blight in Ireland from 1845 to 1851 was full of political confrontation. A more radical Young Ireland group seceded from the Repeal movement in July 1846, and attempted an armed rebellion in 1848. It was unsuccessful.

In 1847, William Smith O'Brien, leader of the Young Ireland party, became one of the founding members of the Irish Confederation to campaign for a Repeal of the Act of Union, and called for the export of grain to be stopped and the ports closed. The following year, he helped organise the short-lived Young Irelander Rebellion of 1848 in County Tipperary.

Government response

Government responses to previous food shortages

When Ireland experienced food shortages in 1782–1783, ports were closed to exporting food, with the intention of keeping locally grown food in Ireland to feed the hungry. Irish food prices promptly dropped. Some merchants lobbied against the export ban, but the government in the 1780s overrode their protests.

Tory government

Historian F. S. L. Lyons characterised the initial response of the British government to the early, less severe phase of the famine as "prompt and relatively successful". Confronted by widespread crop failure in November 1845, the Prime Minister, Sir Robert Peel, purchased £100,000 worth of maize and cornmeal secretly from America with Baring Brothers initially acting as his agents. The government hoped that they would not "stifle private enterprise" and that their actions would not act as a disincentive to local relief efforts. Due to poor weather conditions, the first shipment did not arrive in Ireland until the beginning of February 1846. The initial shipments were of unground dried kernels, but the few Irish mills in operation were not equipped for milling maize and a long and complicated milling process had to be adopted before the meal could be distributed. In addition, before the cornmeal could be consumed, it had to be "very much" cooked again, or eating it could result in severe bowel complaints. Due to its yellow colour, and initial unpopularity, it became known as "Peel's brimstone".

In October 1845, Peel moved to repeal the Corn Laws—tariffs on grain which kept the price of bread high—but the issue split his party and he had insufficient support from his own colleagues to push the measure through. He resigned the premiership in December, but the opposition was unable to form a government and he was re-appointed. In March, Peel set up a programme of public works in Ireland, but the famine situation worsened during 1846, and the repeal of the Corn Laws in that year did little to help the starving Irish; the measure split the Conservative Party, leading to the fall of Peel's ministry. On 25 June, the second reading of the government's Irish Coercion Bill was defeated by 73 votes in the House of Commons by a combination of Whigs, Radicals, Irish Repealers, and protectionist Conservatives. Peel was forced to resign as prime minister on 29 June, and the Whig leader, Lord John Russell, became prime minister.

Whig government

The measures undertaken by Peel's successor, Russell, proved inadequate as the crisis deepened. The new Whig administration, influenced by the doctrine of laissez-faire, believed that the market would provide the food needed. They refused to interfere with the movement of food to England, and then halted the previous government's food and relief works, leaving many hundreds of thousands of people without access to work, money, or food. Russell's ministry introduced a new programme of public works that by the end of December 1846 employed some half a million but proved impossible to administer.

Charles Trevelyan, who was in charge of the administration of government relief, limited the Government's food aid programme because of a firm belief in laissez-faire.

In January 1847, the government abandoned this policy, realising that it had failed, and turned to a mixture of "indoor" and "outdoor" direct relief; the former administered in workhouses through the Irish Poor Laws, the latter through soup kitchens. The costs of the Poor Law fell primarily on the local landlords, some of whom in turn attempted to reduce their liability by evicting their tenants.

In June 1847, the Poor Law Amendment Act was passed which embodied the principle, popular in Britain, that Irish property must support Irish poverty. The landed proprietors in Ireland were held in Britain to have created the conditions that led to the famine. However, it was asserted that the British parliament since the Act of Union of 1800 was partly to blame. This point was raised in The Illustrated London News on 13 February 1847: "There was no law it would not pass at their request, and no abuse it would not defend for them." On 24 March, The Times reported that Britain had permitted in Ireland "a mass of poverty, disaffection, and degradation without a parallel in the world. It allowed proprietors to suck the very life-blood of that wretched race".

The "Gregory clause" of the Poor Law, named after William H. Gregory, M.P., prohibited anyone who held at least  from receiving relief. In practice, this meant that, if a farmer, having sold all his produce to pay rent and taxes, should be reduced, as many thousands of them were, to applying for public outdoor relief, he would not get it until he had first delivered up all his land to the landlord. Of this Law, Mitchel wrote that "it is the able-bodied idler only who is to be fed—if he attempted to till but one rood of ground, he dies". This simple method of ejectment was called "passing paupers through the workhouse"—a man went in, a pauper came out. These factors combined to drive thousands of people off the land: 90,000 in 1849, and 104,000 in 1850.

In 1849, the Encumbered Estates Act allowed landlord estates to be auctioned off upon the petition of creditors. Estates with debts were then auctioned off at low prices. Wealthy British speculators purchased the lands and "took a harsh view" of the tenant farmers who continued renting. The rents were raised, and tenants evicted to create large cattle grazing pastures. Between 1849 and 1854, some 50,000 families were evicted.

Response of the military
The Royal Navy squadron stationed in Cork under the command of Rear-Admiral Hugh Pigot undertook significant relief operation from 1846 to 1847, transporting government relief into the port of Cork and other ports along the Irish coast, being ordered on 2 January 1846 to assist distressed regions. On 27 December 1846, Trevelyan ordered every available steamer to Ireland to assist in relief, and on 14 January 1847, Pigot received orders to also distribute supplies from the British Relief Association and treat them identically to government aid. In addition, some naval officers under Pigot oversaw the logistics of relief operations further inland from Cork. In February 1847, Trevelyan ordered Royal Navy surgeons dispatched in order to provide medical care for those suffering from illnesses that accompanied starvation, distribute medicines that were in short supply on the island, and assist in proper, sanitary burials for those already deceased. These efforts, although significant, were insufficient at preventing mass mortality from famine and disease.

Food exports

Many Irish people, notably Mitchel, believed that Ireland continued to produce sufficient food to feed its population during the famine, and starvation resulted from exports. According to historian James Donnelly, "the picture of Irish people starving as food was exported was the most powerful image in the nationalist construct of the Famine". However, according to statistics, food imports exceeded exports during the famine. Though grain imports only really became significant after the spring of 1847 and much of the debate "has been conducted within narrow parameters," focusing "almost exclusively on national estimates with little attempt to disaggregate the data by region or by product." The amount of food exported in late 1846 was only one-tenth the amount of potato harvest lost to blight.

The historian Cecil Woodham-Smith wrote in The Great Hunger: Ireland 1845–1849 that no issue has provoked so much anger and embittered relations between England and Ireland "as the indisputable fact that huge quantities of food were exported from Ireland to England throughout the period when the people of Ireland were dying of starvation". While in addition to the maize imports, four times as much wheat was imported into Ireland at the height of the famine as exported, much of the imported wheat was used as livestock feed. Woodham-Smith added that provision via the Poor law union workhouses by the Act of 1838 had to be paid by rates levied on the local property owners, and in areas where the famine was worst, the tenants could not pay their rents to enable landlords to fund the rates and therefore the workhouses. Only by selling food, some of which would inevitably be exported, could a "virtuous circle" be created whereby the rents and rates would be paid, and the workhouses funded. Relief through the workhouse system was simply overwhelmed by the enormous scale and duration of the famine. Nicolas McEvoy, parish priest of Kells, wrote in October 1845:
On my most minute personal inspection of the potato crop in this most fertile potato-growing locale is founded my inexpressibly painful conviction that one family in twenty of the people will not have a single potato left on Christmas day next. Many are the fields I have examined and testimony the most solemn can I tender, that in the great bulk of those fields all the potatoes sizable enough to be sent to table are irreparably damaged, while for the remaining comparatively sounder fields very little hopes are entertained in consequence of the daily rapid development of the deplorable disease.

With starvation at our doors, grimly staring us, vessels laden with our sole hopes of existence, our provisions, are hourly wafted from our every port. From one milling establishment I have last night seen not less than fifty dray loads of meal moving on to Drogheda, thence to go to feed the foreigner, leaving starvation and death the sure and certain fate of the toil and sweat that raised this food.

For their respective inhabitants England, Holland, Scotland, Germany, are taking early the necessary precautions—getting provisions from every possible part of the globe; and I ask are Irishmen alone unworthy the sympathies of a paternal gentry or a paternal Government?

Let Irishmen themselves take heed before the provisions are gone. Let those, too, who have sheep, and oxen, and haggards. Self-preservation is the first law of nature. The right of the starving to try and sustain existence is a right far and away paramount to every right that property confers.

Infinitely more precious in the eyes of reason in the adorable eye of the Omnipotent Creator, is the life of the last and least of human beings than the whole united property of the entire universe. The appalling character of the crisis renders delicacy but criminal and imperatively calls for the timely and explicit notice of principles that will not fail to prove terrible arms in the hands of a neglected, abandoned starving people.

In the 5 May 2020, issue of the Dublin Review of Books, Editor Maurice Earls wrote:

Dr. McEvoy, in his grim forebodings and apocalyptic fear, was closer to the truth than the sanguine rationalists quoted in the newspapers, but McEvoy, like many others, overestimated the likelihood of mass rebellion, and even this great clerical friend of the poor could hardly have contemplated the depth of social, economic and cultural destruction which would persist and deepen over the following century and beyond.

It was politics that turned a disease of potatoes and tomatoes into famine, and it was politics which ensured its disastrous aftereffects would disfigure numerous future generations.

Charity

Total charitable donations for famine relief might have been about £1.5 million of which £856,500 came from outside Ireland. Donations within Ireland are harder to trace; £380,000 of donations were officially registered but once some allowance is made for less formal donations the Irish total probably exceeds that of Britain (£525,000). People of Irish descent also contributed to funds raised outside of Ireland and those donations would be included in the region where the donation was made. English Protestants donated more to Irish famine relief than any other source outside of Ireland.

Large sums of money were donated by charities; the first foreign campaign in December 1845 included the Boston Repeal Association and the Catholic Church Calcutta is credited with making the first larger donations in 1846, summing up to around £14,000. The money raised included contributions by Irish soldiers serving there and Irish people employed by the East India Company. Russian Tsar Alexander II sent funds and Queen Victoria donated £2,000. According to legend, Sultan Abdülmecid I of the Ottoman Empire originally offered to send £10,000 but was asked either by British diplomats or his own ministers to reduce it to £1,000 to avoid donating more than the Queen. U.S. President James K. Polk donated $50 and in 1847 Congressman Abraham Lincoln donated $10 ($307 in 2019 value). Pope Pius IX also made a personal contribution of 1,000 Scudi (approximately £213) for famine relief in Ireland and authorized collections in Rome. 
Most significantly, on 25 March 1847, Pius IX issued the encyclical Praedecessores nostros, which called the whole Catholic world to contribute moneywise and spiritually to Irish relief. Major figures behind international Catholic fundraising for Ireland were the rector of the Pontifical Irish College, Paul Cullen, and the President of the Society of Saint Vincent de Paul, Jules Gossin.

International fundraising activities received donations from locations as diverse as Venezuela, Australia, South Africa, Mexico, Russia and Italy. In addition to the religious, non-religious organisations came to the assistance of famine victims. The British Relief Association was the largest of these groups. Founded on 1 January 1847 by Lionel de Rothschild, Abel Smith, and other prominent bankers and aristocrats, the Association raised money throughout England, America, and Australia; their funding drive was benefited by a "Queen's Letter", a letter from Queen Victoria appealing for money to relieve the distress in Ireland. With this initial letter, the Association raised £171,533. A second, somewhat less successful "Queen's Letter" was issued in late 1847. In total, the Association raised approximately £390,000 for Irish relief.

Private initiatives such as the Central Relief Committee of the Society of Friends (Quakers) attempted to fill the gap caused by the end of government relief, and eventually, the government reinstated the relief works, although bureaucracy slowed the release of food supplies. Thousands of dollars were raised in the United States, including $170 ($5,218 in 2019 value) collected from a group of Native American Choctaws in 1847. Judy Allen, editor of the Choctaw Nation of Oklahoma's newspaper Biskinik, wrote that "It had been just 16 years since the Choctaw people had experienced the Trail of Tears, and they had faced starvation ... It was an amazing gesture." To mark the 150th anniversary, eight Irish people retraced the Trail of Tears.

Contributions by the United States during the famine were highlighted by Senator Henry Clay who said; "No imagination can conceive—no tongue express—no brush paint—the horrors of the scenes which are daily exhibited in Ireland." He called upon Americans to remind them that the practice of charity was the greatest act of humanity they could do. In total, 118 vessels sailed from the US to Ireland with relief goods valued at $545,145. Specific states which provided aid include South Carolina and Philadelphia, Pennsylvania. Pennsylvania was the second most important state for famine relief in the US and the second-largest shipping port for aid to Ireland. The state hosted the Philadelphia Irish Famine Relief Committee. Catholics, Methodists, Quakers, Presbyterians, Episcopalians, Lutherans, Moravian and Jewish groups put aside their differences in the name of humanity to help out the Irish. South Carolina rallied around the efforts to help those experiencing the famine. They raised donations of money, food and clothing to help the victims of the famine—Irish immigrants made up 39% of the white population in the southern cities. Historian Harvey Strum claims that "The states ignored all their racial, religious, and political differences to support the cause for relief."

Eviction

Landlords were responsible for paying the rates of every tenant whose yearly rent was £4 or less. Landlords whose land was crowded with poorer tenants were now faced with large bills. Many began clearing the poor tenants from their small plots and letting the land in larger plots for over £4 which then reduced their debts. In 1846, there had been some clearances, but the great mass of evictions came in 1847. According to James S. Donnelly Jr., it is impossible to be sure how many people were evicted during the years of the famine and its immediate aftermath. It was only in 1849 that the police began to keep a count, and they recorded a total of almost 250,000 persons as officially evicted between 1849 and 1854.

Donnelly considered this to be an underestimate, and if the figures were to include the number pressured into "voluntary" surrenders during the whole period (1846–1854), the figure would almost certainly exceed half a million persons. While Helen Litton says there were also thousands of "voluntary" surrenders, she notes also that there was "precious little voluntary about them". In some cases, tenants were persuaded to accept a small sum of money to leave their homes, "cheated into believing the workhouse would take them in".

West Clare was one of the worst areas for evictions, where landlords turned thousands of families out and demolished their derisory cabins. Captain Kennedy in April 1848 estimated that 1,000 houses, with an average of six people to each, had been levelled since November. The Mahon family of Strokestown House evicted 3,000 people in 1847 and were still able to dine on lobster soup.

After Clare, the worst area for evictions was County Mayo, accounting for 10% of all evictions between 1849 and 1854. He was quoted as saying that "he would not breed paupers to pay priests". Having turned out in the parish of Ballinrobe over 2,000 tenants alone, he then used the cleared land as grazing farms. In 1848, the Marquis of Sligo owed £1,650 to Westport Union; he was also an evicting landlord, though he claimed to be selective, saying that he was only getting rid of the idle and dishonest. Altogether, he cleared about 25% of his tenants.

In 1847, Bishop of Meath, Thomas Nulty, described his personal recollection of the evictions in a pastoral letter to his clergy:

The population in Drumbaragh, a townland in County Meath, plummeted 67 per cent between 1841 and 1851; in neighbouring Springville, it fell 54 per cent. There were fifty houses in Springville in 1841 and only eleven left in 1871.

According to Litton, evictions might have taken place earlier but for fear of the secret societies. However, they were now greatly weakened by the Famine. Revenge still occasionally took place, with seven landlords being shot, six fatally, during the autumn and winter of 1847. Ten other occupiers of land, though without tenants, were also murdered, she says.

One such landlord reprisal occurred in West Roscommon. The "notorious" Major Denis Mahon enforced thousands of his tenants into eviction before the end of 1847, with an estimated 60 per cent decline in population in some parishes. He was shot dead in that year. In East Roscommon, "where conditions were more benign", the estimated decline in population was under 10 percent.

Lord Clarendon, alarmed at the number of landlords being shot and that this might mean rebellion, asked for special powers. Lord John Russell was not sympathetic to this appeal. Lord Clarendon believed that the landlords themselves were mostly responsible for the tragedy in the first place, saying that "It is quite true that landlords in England would not like to be shot like hares and partridges ... but neither does any landlord in England turn out fifty persons at once and burn their houses over their heads, giving them no provision for the future." The Crime and Outrage Act was passed in December 1847 as a compromise, and additional troops were sent to Ireland.

The "Gregory clause", described by Donnelly as a "vicious amendment to the Irish poor law", had been a successful Tory amendment to the Whig poor-relief bill which became law in early June 1847, where its potential as an estate-clearing device was widely recognised in parliament, although not in advance. At first, the poor law commissioners and inspectors viewed the clause as a valuable instrument for a more cost-effective administration of public relief, but the drawbacks soon became apparent, even from an administrative perspective. They would soon view them as little more than murderous from a humanitarian perspective. According to Donnelly, it became obvious that the quarter-acre clause was "indirectly a death-dealing instrument".

Emigration

At least a million people are thought to have emigrated as a result of the famine. There were about 1 million long-distance emigrants between 1846 and 1851, mainly to North America. The total given in the 1851 census is 967,908. Short-distance emigrants, mainly to Britain, may have numbered 200,000 or more.

While the famine was responsible for a significant increase in emigration from Ireland, of anywhere from 45% to nearly 85% depending on the year and the county, it was not the sole cause. The beginning of mass emigration from Ireland can be traced to the mid-18th century, when some 250,000 people left Ireland over a period of 50 years to settle in the New World. Irish economist Cormac Ó Gráda estimates that between 1 million and 1.5 million people emigrated during the 30 years between 1815 (when Napoleon was defeated in Waterloo) and 1845 (when the Great Famine began). However, during the worst of the famine, emigration reached somewhere around 250,000 in one year alone, with western Ireland seeing the most emigrants.

Families did not migrate en masse, but younger members of families did, so much so that emigration almost became a rite of passage, as evidenced by the data that show that, unlike similar emigrations throughout world history, women emigrated just as often, just as early, and in the same numbers as men. The emigrants would send remittances (reaching a total of £1,404,000 by 1851) back to family in Ireland, which, in turn, allowed another member of their family to leave.

Emigration during the famine years of 1845–1850 was primarily to England, Scotland, South Wales, North America, and Australia. Many of those fleeing to the Americas used the McCorkell Line. One city that experienced a particularly strong influx of Irish immigrants was Liverpool, with at least one-quarter of the city's population being Irish-born by 1851. This would heavily influence the city's identity and culture in the coming years, earning it the nickname of "Ireland's second capital". Liverpool became the only place outside of Ireland to elect an Irish nationalist to parliament when it elected T. P. O'Connor in 1885, and continuously re-elected him unopposed until his death in 1929. As of 2020, it is estimated that three quarters of people from the city have Irish ancestry.

Of the more than 100,000 Irish that sailed to Canada in 1847, an estimated one out of five died from disease and malnutrition, including over 5,000 at Grosse Isle, Quebec, an island in the Saint Lawrence River used to quarantine ships near Quebec City. Overcrowded, poorly maintained, and badly provisioned vessels known as coffin ships sailed from small, unregulated harbours in the West of Ireland in contravention of British safety requirements, and mortality rates were high. The 1851 census reported that more than half the inhabitants of Toronto were Irish, and, in 1847 alone, 38,000 Irish flooded a city with fewer than 20,000 citizens. Other Canadian cities such as Quebec City, Montreal, Ottawa, Kingston, Hamilton, and Saint John also received large numbers. By 1871, 55% of Saint John residents were Irish natives or children of Irish-born parents. Unlike the United States, Canada could not close its ports to Irish ships because it was part of the British Empire, so emigrants could obtain cheap passage in returning empty lumber holds.

In America, most Irish became city-dwellers; with little money, many had to settle in the cities that the ships they came on landed in. By 1850, the Irish made up a quarter of the population in Boston, New York City, Philadelphia, and Baltimore.

The famine marked the beginning of the depopulation of Ireland in the 19th century. The population had increased by 13–14% in the first three decades of the 19th century; between 1831 and 1841, the population grew by 5%. Application of Thomas Malthus's idea of population expanding geometrically while resources increase arithmetically was popular during the famines of 1817 and 1822. By the 1830s, they were seen as overly simplistic, and Ireland's problems were seen "less as an excess of population than as a lack of capital investment". The population of Ireland was increasing no faster than that of England, which suffered no equivalent catastrophe. By 1854, between 1.5 and 2 million Irish left their country due to evictions, starvation, and harsh living conditions.

Death toll

It is not known exactly how many people died during the period of the famine, although it is believed that more died from disease than from starvation. State registration of births, marriages, or deaths had not yet begun, and records kept by the Catholic Church are incomplete. One possible estimate has been reached by comparing the expected population with the eventual numbers in the 1850s. A census taken in 1841 recorded a population of 8,175,124. A census immediately after the famine in 1851 counted 6,552,385, a drop of over 1.5 million in 10 years. The census commissioners estimated that, at the normal rate of population increase, the population in 1851 should have grown to just over 9 million if the famine had not occurred.

On the in-development Great Irish Famine Online resource, produced by the Geography department of University College Cork, the population of Ireland section states, that together with the census figures being called low, before the famine it reads that "it is now generally believed" that over 8.75 million people populated the island of Ireland prior to it striking.

In 1851, the census commissioners collected information on the number who died in each family since 1841, and the cause, season, and year of death. They recorded 21,770 total deaths from starvation in the previous decade and 400,720 deaths from diseases. Listed diseases were fever, diphtheria, dysentery, cholera, smallpox, and influenza, with the first two being the main killers (222,021 and 93,232). The commissioners acknowledged that their figures were incomplete and that the true number of deaths was probably higher:

The greater the amount of destitution of mortality ... the less will be the amount of recorded deaths derived through any household form;—for not only were whole families swept away by disease ... but whole villages were effaced from off the land.

Later historians agree that the 1851 death tables "were flawed and probably under-estimated the level of mortality". The combination of institutional and figures provided by individuals gives "an incomplete and biased count" of fatalities during the famine. Cormac Ó Gráda, referencing the work of W. A. MacArthur, writes that specialists have long known that the Irish death tables were inaccurate, and undercounted the number of deaths.

S. H. Cousens's estimate of 800,000 deaths relied heavily on retrospective information contained in the 1851 census and elsewhere, and is now regarded as too low. Modern historian Joseph Lee says "at least 800,000", and R. F. Foster estimates that "at least 775,000 died, mostly through disease, including cholera in the latter stages of the holocaust". He further notes that "a recent sophisticated computation estimates excess deaths from 1846 to 1851 as between 1,000,000 and 1,500,000 ... after a careful critique of this, other statisticians arrive at a figure of 1,000,000".

Joel Mokyr's estimates at an aggregated county level range from 1.1 million to 1.5 million deaths between 1846 and 1851. Mokyr produced two sets of data which contained an upper-bound and lower-bound estimate, which showed not much difference in regional patterns. The true figure is likely to lie between the two extremes of half and one and a half million, and the most widely accepted estimate is one million.

Another area of uncertainty lies in the descriptions of disease given by tenants as to the cause of their relatives' deaths. Though the 1851 census has been rightly criticised as underestimating the true extent of mortality, it does provide a framework for the medical history of the Great Famine. The diseases that badly affected the population fell into two categories: famine-induced diseases and diseases of nutritional deficiency. Of the nutritional deficiency diseases, the most commonly experienced were starvation and marasmus, as well as a condition at the time called dropsy. Dropsy (oedema) was a popular name given for the symptoms of several diseases, one of which, kwashiorkor, is associated with starvation.

However, the greatest mortality was not from nutritional deficiency diseases, but from famine-induced ailments. The malnourished are very vulnerable to infections; therefore, these were more severe when they occurred. Measles, diphtheria, diarrhoea, tuberculosis, most respiratory infections, whooping cough, many intestinal parasites, and cholera were all strongly conditioned by nutritional status. Potentially lethal diseases, such as smallpox and influenza, were so virulent that their spread was independent of nutrition. The best example of this phenomenon was fever, which exacted the greatest death toll. In the popular mind, as well as medical opinion, fever and famine were closely related. Social dislocation—the congregation of the hungry at soup kitchens, food depots, and overcrowded workhouses—created conditions that were ideal for spreading infectious diseases such as typhus, typhoid, and relapsing fever. 

Diarrhoeal diseases were the result of poor hygiene, bad sanitation, and dietary changes. The concluding attack on a population incapacitated by famine was delivered by Asiatic cholera, which had visited Ireland briefly in the 1830s. In the following decade, it spread uncontrollably across Asia, through Europe, and into Britain, finally reaching Ireland in 1849. Some scholars estimate that the population of Ireland was reduced by 20–25%.

After the famine

Ireland's mean age of marriage in 1830 was 23.8 for women and 27.5 for men, where they had once been 21 for women and 25 for men, and those who never married numbered about 10% of the population; in 1840, they had respectively risen to 24.4 and 27.7. In the decades after the Famine, the age of marriage had risen to 28–29 for women and 33 for men, and as many as a third of Irishmen and a quarter of Irishwomen never married, due to low wages and chronic economic problems that discouraged early and universal marriage.

One consequence of the increase in the number of orphaned children was that some young women turned to prostitution to provide for themselves. Some of the women who became Wrens of the Curragh were famine orphans.

The potato blight would return to Ireland in 1879, though by then the rural cottier tenant farmers and labourers of Ireland had begun the "Land War", described as one of the largest agrarian movements to take place in nineteenth-century Europe.

By the time the potato blight returned in 1879, The Land League, which was led by Michael Davitt, who was born during the Great Famine and whose family had been evicted when Davitt was only 4 years old, encouraged the mass boycott of "notorious landlords" with some members also physically blocking evictions. The policy, however, would soon be suppressed. Despite close to 1000 interned under the 1881 Coercion Act for suspected membership. With the reduction in the rate of homelessness and the increased physical and political networks eroding the landlordism system, the severity of the following shorter famine would be limited.

According to the linguist Erick Falc'her-Poyroux, surprisingly, for a country renowned for its rich musical heritage, only a small number of folk songs can be traced back to the demographic and cultural catastrophe brought about by the Great Famine, and he infers from this that the subject was generally avoided for decades among poorer people as it brought back too many sorrowful memories. Also, large areas of the country became uninhabited and the folk song collectors of the eighteenth and nineteenth centuries did not collect the songs they heard in the Irish language, as the language of the peasantry was often regarded as dead, or "not delicate enough for educated ears". Of the songs that have survived probably the best known is Skibbereen. Emigration has been an important source of inspiration for songs of the Irish during the 20th century.

Analysis of the government's role

Contemporary analysis

Contemporary opinion was sharply critical of the Russell government's response to and management of the crisis. From the start, there were accusations that the government failed to grasp the magnitude of the disaster. Sir James Graham, who had served as Home Secretary in Sir Robert Peel's late government, wrote to Peel that, in his opinion, "the real extent and magnitude of the Irish difficulty are underestimated by the Government, and cannot be met by measures within the strict rule of economical science".

This criticism was not confined to outside critics. The Lord-Lieutenant of Ireland, Lord Clarendon, wrote a letter to Russell on 26 April 1849, urging that the government propose additional relief measures: "I don't think there is another legislature in Europe that would disregard such suffering as now exists in the west of Ireland, or coldly persist in a policy of extermination." Also in 1849, the Chief Poor Law Commissioner, Edward Twisleton, resigned in protest over the Rate-in-Aid Act, which provided additional funds for the Poor Law through a 6d in the pound levy on all rateable properties in Ireland. Twisleton testified that "comparatively trifling sums were required for Britain to spare itself the deep disgrace of permitting its miserable fellow-subjects to die of starvation". According to Peter Gray in his book The Irish Famine, the government spent £7 million for relief in Ireland between 1845 and 1850, "representing less than half of one per cent of the British gross national product over five years. Contemporaries noted the sharp contrast with the £20 million compensation given to West Indian slave-owners in the 1830s."

Other critics maintained that, even after the government recognised the scope of the crisis, it failed to take sufficient steps to address it. John Mitchel, one of the leaders of the Young Ireland Movement, wrote in 1860:

I have called it an artificial famine: that is to say, it was a famine which desolated a rich and fertile island that produced every year abundance and superabundance to sustain all her people and many more. The English, indeed, call the famine a "dispensation of Providence"; and ascribe it entirely to the blight on potatoes. But potatoes failed in like manner all over Europe, yet there was no famine save in Ireland. The British account of the matter, then, is first, a fraud; second, a blasphemy. The Almighty, indeed, sent the potato blight, but the English created the famine.

Still, other critics saw reflected in the government's response its attitude to the so-called "Irish Question". Nassau Senior, an economics professor at Oxford University, wrote that the Famine "would not kill more than one million people, and that would scarcely be enough to do any good". In 1848, Denis Shine Lawlor suggested that Russell was a student of the Elizabethan poet Edmund Spenser, who had calculated "how far English colonisation and English policy might be most effectively carried out by Irish starvation". Charles Trevelyan, the civil servant with most direct responsibility for the government's handling of the famine, described it in 1848 as "a direct stroke of an all-wise and all-merciful Providence", which laid bare "the deep and inveterate root of social evil"; he affirmed that the Famine was "the sharp but effectual remedy by which the cure is likely to be effected. God grant that the generation to which this opportunity has been offered may rightly perform its part..."

Historical analysis

Christine Kinealy has written that "the major tragedy of the Irish Famine of 1845–1852 marked a watershed in modern Irish history. Its occurrence, however, was neither inevitable nor unavoidable". The underlying factors which combined to cause the famine were aggravated by an inadequate government response. Kinealy notes that the "government had to do something to help alleviate the suffering" but that "it became apparent that the government was using its information not merely to help it formulate its relief policies, but also as an opportunity to facilitate various long-desired changes within Ireland".

Some also pointed to the structure of the British Empire as a contributing factor. James Anthony Froude wrote that "England governed Ireland for what she deemed her own interest, making her calculations on the gross balance of her trade ledgers, and leaving moral obligations aside, as if right and wrong had been blotted out of the statute book of the Universe." Dennis Clark, an Irish-American historian and critic of empire, claimed the famine was "the culmination of generations of neglect, misrule and repression. It was an epic of English colonial cruelty and inadequacy. For the landless cabin dwellers, it meant emigration or extinction..."

Position of the British government 

The British government has not expressly apologized for its role in the famine. But in 1997, at a commemoration event in County Cork, the actor Gabriel Byrne read out a message by Prime Minister Tony Blair that acknowledged the inadequacy of the government response. It asserted that "those who governed in London at the time failed their people through standing by while a crop failure turned into a massive human tragedy". The message was well received in Ireland, where it was understood as the long-sought-after British apology. Archive documents released in 2021 showed that the message was not in fact written or approved by Blair, who could not be reached by aides at the time. It was therefore approved by Blair's principal private secretary John Holmes on his own initiative.

Genocide question

The famine remains a controversial event in Irish history. Debate and discussion about whether the British government's response to the failure of the potato crop, and the continued exportation of food crops and livestock, constituted a genocide, remains a subject of political debate. 

Virtually all historians reject the claim that the famine constituted a genocide due, in part, to the lack of intent behind famine related deaths. For a mass-death atrocity to be defined as genocide, it must include the intentional destruction of a people.

In 1996, the U.S. state of New Jersey included the famine in the "Holocaust and Genocide Curriculum" of its secondary schools. In the 1990s, Irish-American lobbying groups, campaigned vigorously to include the study of the Irish Famine in school curriculums, alongside studies of the Holocaust, slavery and other similar atrocities. The New Jersey curriculum was pushed by such lobbying groups and was drafted by the librarian James Mullin. Following criticism, the New Jersey Holocaust Commission requested statements from two academics that the Irish famine was genocide, which was eventually provided by law professors Charles E. Rice and Francis Boyle, who had not been previously known for studying Irish history. They concluded that the British government deliberately pursued a race- and ethnicity-based policy aimed at destroying the Irish people and that the policy of mass starvation amounted to genocide per retrospective application of article 2 of the Hague Convention of 1948.

Irish historian Cormac Ó Gráda rejected the claim that the famine was a genocide and stated that "no academic historian continues to take the claim of 'genocide' seriously". He argued that "genocide includes murderous intent, and it must be said that not even the most bigoted and racist commentators of the day sought the extermination of the Irish", and he also stated that most people in Whitehall "hoped for better times for Ireland". Additionally, he stated that the claim of genocide overlooks "the enormous challenge facing relief agencies, both central and local, public and private". Ó Gráda thinks that a case of neglect is easier to sustain than a case of genocide. W. D. Rubinstein also rejected the genocide claim. James S. Donnelly Jr., a historian at the University of Wisconsin–Madison, wrote in his book, Landlord and Tenant in Nineteenth-century Ireland:

the government's abject failure to stop or even slow down the clearances (evictions) contributed in a major way to enshrining the idea of English state-sponsored genocide in Irish popular mind. Or perhaps one should say in the Irish mind, for this was a notion that appealed to many educated and discriminating men and women, and not only to the revolutionary minority ... And it is also my contention that while genocide was not in fact committed, what happened during and as a result of the clearances had the look of genocide to a great many Irish.

Historian Donald Akenson, who has written twenty-four books on Ireland, stated that "When you see [the word Holocaust used with regard to the famine], you know that you are encountering famine-porn. It is inevitably part of a presentation that is historically unbalanced and, like other kinds of pornography, is distinguished by a covert (and sometimes overt) appeal to misanthropy and almost always an incitement to hatred."

In 2019, Maine legislators argued for the inclusion of education about Ireland and the famine in "The Holocaust Bill, An Act To Require Education about the Holocaust."

The Irish state broadcaster RTÉ aired a two-part documentary titled The Hunger: The Story of the Irish Famine in November 2020. In it, Brendan O'Leary, Lauder Professor of political science, offered to use the term 'genoslaughter' rather than the term 'genocide' because, in his view, the term 'genoslaughter' is a more accurately descriptive term for the British response to the potato blight than the term 'genocide' is. O'Leary pointed out that the decision-making by the government of the day was based on capitalist principles rather than ethnicity; its aim was to reduce the tax burden on the middle-class (who were of both main ethnicities) by clearing the 'unproductive' landless poor from Ireland.
According to historian Liam Kennedy, an editorial in the Irish Echo by James Pius Sweeney stated: 'The genocide of the Great Famine is distinct in the fact that the British created the conditions of dire hopelessness, and desperate dependence on the potato crop through a series of sadistic, debasing, premeditated and barbarous Penal Laws, which deliberately and systematically stripped the Irish of even the least semblance of basic human freedom.' When blight struck the Irish were 'totally vulnerable'. This was a 'nuanced genocide', he continues, one that manipulated fate 'by pushing a people to the brink of annihilation and turning away so not to hear the wailing …'.

However, Kennedy himself does not believe that the Famine constituted a genocide: "There is no case for genocide when you think of, as part of British government policies in Ireland, three-quarters of a million people working on public relief schemes. When you have three million people at one stage receiving soup from soup kitchens right across Ireland in their locality."

Historian Mark Tauger writes that a "nationalist literature" exists about the famine that obfuscates and ignores the effects of natural factors and instead places the entirety of the blame on the British government, which he compares to similar reductionist and inaccurate narratives from Ukrainian nationalists about the Soviet famine of 1930-1933. Tauger criticises these nationalistic perspectives as being ungrounded in reality and at odds with all scholarship on the matter, as even those historians most critical of British policymaking during the period accept potato blight as the main, overarching cause of the famine.

Professor of history John Leazer writes that the binary framing of the debate about the British government's, and particularly Trevelyan's, actions as being good or bad is "unsatisfactory", and that the entire debate surrounding the question of genocide serves to oversimplify and obfuscate complex factors behind the actions of the government as a whole and individuals within it.

Memorials

Ireland's National Famine Memorial is situated in Murrisk Millennium Peace Park, a five-acre park overlooking the Atlantic Ocean in the village of Murrisk, County Mayo at the foot of Croagh Patrick mountain. Designed by Irish artist John Behan, the memorial consists of a bronze sculpture of a coffin ship with skeletons interwoven through the rigging symbolising the many emigrants that did not survive the journey across the ocean to Britain, America and elsewhere. It was unveiled on 20 July 1997 by then-President Mary Robinson. The Famine Commemoration Committee who led the project chose the site in Murrisk as they felt it was "...entirely fitting that the national famine memorial [..] be located in the west, which suffered most during the Famine with one in four of the population of Connaught dying in those terrible years."

The National Famine Commemoration Day is observed annually in Ireland, usually on a Sunday in May.

It is also memorialized in many locations throughout Ireland, especially in those regions of Ireland which suffered the greatest losses, and it is also memorialized overseas, particularly in cities with large populations which are descended from Irish immigrants, such as New York City. These include, at Custom House Quay, Dublin, the thin sculptural figures, by artist Rowan Gillespie, who are portrayed as if they are walking towards the emigration ships which are docked on the Dublin Quayside. 

Kindred Spirits, a large stainless steel sculpture of nine eagle feathers by artist Alex Pentek was erected in 2017 in the Irish town of Midleton, County Cork, to thank the Choctaw people for its financial assistance during the famine.

Among the memorials in Ireland are the National Famine Museum and Strokestown Park House in County Roscommon; the Irish Famine Exhibition in Dublin; the Jeanie Johnston: An Irish Famine Story, Dublin; EPIC The Irish Emigration Museum, Dublin; and the Doagh Famine Village in County Donegal.

Among the memorials in the US is the Irish Hunger Memorial near a section of the Manhattan waterfront in New York City, where many Irish arrived and the National Memorial to An Gorta Mór, in Philadelphia, a sculpture suggesting the multitudes with 35 life-size bronze figures arranged in clusters of vignettes. Ireland's Great Hunger Institute, at Quinnipiac University fosters a deeper understanding of the Great Hunger of Ireland and its causes and consequences through a strategic program of lectures, conferences, course offerings and publications. Ireland's Great Hunger Museum, at Quinnipiac University, hosts the world's largest collection of Great Hunger-related art including artefacts and printed materials. An annual Great Famine walk from Doolough to Louisburgh, County Mayo was inaugurated in 1988 and has been led by such notable personalities as Archbishop Desmond Tutu of South Africa and representatives of the Choctaw Nation of Oklahoma. The walk, organised by Afri, takes place on the first or second Saturday of May and links the memory of the Great Hunger with a contemporary Human Rights issue.

See also

 Great Famine's effect on the American economy
 Highland Potato Famine (an agrarian crisis in Scotland at the same time)

References

Informational notes

Footnotes

Citations

Bibliography

 
 
 
 
 
 
 
 
 
 
 
 
 
 
 
 
 
 
 
 
 
 
 
 
 
 
 
 
 
 
 
 
 
 
 
 
 
 
 
 
 
 
 
 
 
 
 
 
 
 
 
 
 
 

Further reading
 .
 .
 .
 .
 R. Dudley Edwards and T. Desmond Williams (eds.), The Great Famine: Studies in Irish history 1845–1852.
 Henry George, Progress and Poverty Chapter 6: "The Truth about Ireland" – George's account of the Irish famine.
 Robert Kee, Ireland: A History.
 Mary C. Kelly, Ireland's Great Famine in Irish-American History: Enshrining a Fateful Memory. Lanham, MD: Rowman and Littlefield, 2014.
 John Kelly, The Graves are Walking, The Great Famine and the Saga of the Irish People (2012).
 .
 McMahon, Cian T. The Coffin Ship: Life and Death at Sea during the Great Irish Famine (NYU Press, 2021)
 O'Neill Peter D. (2019). "Famine Irish and the American Racial State." New York: Routledge. (ISBN 978-0-367-34444-3)
 Canon John O'Rourke, The Great Irish Famine [1874]. Veritas Publications, 1989.
 George Poulett Scrope, Letters to Lord John Russell on the Further Measures for the Social Amelioration of Ireland|Letters to Lord John Russell on the Further Measures for the Social Amelioration of Ireland. James Ridgway, 1847.
 
 .
 The "Hungry Forties", an analysis of the Chrononym.

External links

 Irish National Archives information on the Famine
 Cork Multitext Project article on the Famine, by Donnchadh Ó Corráin
 Historical society of Pennsylvania. Primary Sources. The Curtis Family Letters, Irish Immigrant Letters Home.
 "The Great Irish Famine", BBC In our time podcast, April 2019
 "When Ireland Starved", Radharc/RTE. The four part Irish documentary series from 1992.
 Radio Essay on 175th Commemoration of the Beginning of the Great Hunger. "Contagion In This Family's Past And Present." New England Public Media, 2021.
The Great Irish Potato Famine Guest Contribution, History Cooperative, 31 October 2009,

 
Famines in Ireland
Genocides in Europe
19th-century disasters in Ireland
1840s disasters in Ireland 
1850s disasters in Ireland
1845 disasters in Ireland
1852 disasters in Ireland
19th-century famines